Davy Crockett Lake is a  body of water impounded by Nolichucky Dam on the Nolichucky River,  south of Greeneville  in Greene County in the U.S. state of Tennessee. It is also known as the Davy Crockett Reservoir and is maintained by the Tennessee Valley Authority (TVA).  It is a recreation site home to a variety of game fish.

Recreation
A park owned by Greene County, called Kinser Park is located on the north shore of the lake. A small TVA recreation area is located below the dam.

References

External links
Kinser Park official site

French Broad River
Davy Crockett
Reservoirs in Tennessee
Bodies of water of Greene County, Tennessee